Podfranciszkany  is a village in the administrative district of Gmina Nowy Kawęczyn, within Skierniewice County, Łódź Voivodeship, in central Poland.

The village has a population of 80.

References

Podfranciszkany